Ben is the third solo studio album by American rapper Macklemore. It was released on March 3, 2023, by Bendo LLC. It features guest appearances by Charlieonnafriday, Collett, DJ Premier, Jackson Lee Morgan, Livingston, Morray, NLE Choppa, Sarah Barthel, Tones and I, and Vic Daggs II.

Background and promotion
Macklemore officially revealed the album's release date and cover art on November 7, 2022. He has stated that much of the album's content was influenced by his relapse with alcohol addiction during the COVID-19 lockdowns: "I think that pain is a catalyst for great art," he said. "I don't want to inflict the pain on myself anymore to make art. It's not like I need to self-sabotage in order to create, but I think that it created some darker, more honest, and vulnerable moments on the album." 

On February 16, 2023, Macklemore and his seven-year-old daughter, Sloane, filmed part of their music video for "No Bad Days" at the Climate Pledge Arena during a Seattle Kraken hockey game. Sloane directed the entire music video, which was released March 3, 2023.

Singles
The album was preceded by four singles. The first single, "Chant" featuring Tones and I, was released on July 22, 2022. The second single, "Maniac" featuring Windser, was released on August 19, 2022. The third single, "Faithful" featuring NLE Choppa, was released on October 28, 2022. The fourth single, "Heroes" featuring DJ Premier, was released on January 20, 2023.

Track listing

Note
  signifes a co-producer

Charts

References

2023 albums
Macklemore albums